Élisabeth Brasseur (8 January 1896 – 23 November 1972) was a French choral conductor. In 1920 she founded a choir which has borne her name since 1943.

Biography 

Marie Josèphe Jeanne Élisabeth Brasseur was born in Verdun in Lorraine, from Jean Marie Joseph Brasseur, transport entrepreneur, and Marguerite Maria Grosjean. It is from the maternal side that the taste for music came to her, since her grandfather Ernest Grosjean was organist of the Cathédrale Notre-Dame de Verdun. He's the one she started studying music with.

This formation was to become one of the most famous choir formations of the post-war period.

Under the direction of André Cluytens, she directed the choir of the Aix-en-Provence Festival in a production of Mireille by Charles Gounod. With Pierre Dervaux, she directed the Chœur du Conservatoire de Paris in a production of Dido and Æneas by Henry Purcell at the Aix-en-Provence Festival in 1960, which was recorded on disc.

For her long contribution to choral music, the city of Versailles, where she remained until her death on 23 November 1972, aged 77, named a place in her honour, Place Élisabeth-Brasseur, where the Sainte-Jeanne d'Arc church is located, where she founded her first choir.

Recordings 
 Charles Gounod: Mireille, choirs of the Aix-en-Provence Festival, choral conductor: Elisabeth Brasseur, Orchestre de la Société des concerts du Conservatoire, dir. André Cluytens (Grand Prix du disque of the Académie Charles-Cros)
 Henry Purcell: Dido and Æneas, Orchestre de la société des concerts du conservatoire, dir. Pierre Dervaux, Choir of the Conservatoire de Paris directed by Élisabeth Brasseur, Aix-en-Provence Festival, ed. Walhall; 1960
 Jean-Philippe Rameau: Hippolyte et Aricie, Orchestre de la société des concerts du conservatoire, dir. Jacques Jouineau, artistic direction Gabriel Dussurget, choirs Elisabeth Brasseur, dir. Élisabeth Brasseur. Cour d'honneur du Palais Soubise Festival du Marais 1964.

References

Bibliography

External links 
 Website of the choir Élisabeth Brasseur
 Chœurs Élisabeth Brasseur
 Élisabeth Brasseur on Encyclopédie Larousse 
 Chœur Elisabeth Brasseur, Concert Mozart and Vivaldi on 19 June 2013 on YouTube

French choral conductors
1896 births
People from Verdun
1972 deaths
20th-century French conductors (music)